Pennsylvania Institute of Technology (P.I.T.) is a private junior college and technical school in Upper Providence Township, Delaware County, Pennsylvania, near Media. The college, which typically enrolls between 450 and 850 students, is accredited by the Middle States Commission on Higher Education.

History
PIT was founded in 1953 by Walter Garrison, an aerospace engineer, to provide math and science training for pre-engineering students. Until 1982, the school was located in a collection of buildings in Upper Darby; fourteen acres were purchased to construct a new campus in the late 1970s. In 1976, P.I.T. was approved by the Pennsylvania Department of Education to award specialized associate degrees. In 1983, P.I.T. gained accreditation from the Middle States Commission on Higher Education (now the Middle States Commission on Higher Education). In 2021, Middle States Commission on Higher Education approved the college's awarding of Bachelor's Degrees.

Academics
PIT offers bachelor's, associate degrees, and certificate programs.

References

External links
Official site

Two-year colleges in the United States
Educational institutions established in 1953
Universities and colleges in Delaware County, Pennsylvania
Universities and colleges in Philadelphia
1953 establishments in Pennsylvania